Fran Galović (20 July 1887 – 26 October 1914) was a Croatian writer who lived in the Austro-Hungarian Empire.

Biography
Born in Peteranec near Koprivnica, he studied slavistics and philology in Zagreb. During that time he started the magazine Mlada Hrvatska. He worked as a teacher in the II. Gymnasium of Zagreb. 4 books were published during his lifetime: Tamara (1907), Četiri grada (1913), Začarano ogledalo (1913) and Ispovijed (1914). Most of his poems were written in the Kajkavian dialect, but none of his Kajkavian poems were published during his lifetime. He died in battle on the Serbian Front during World War I.

In the collection Z mojih bregov Galović repeated some motives known from his Štokavian poetry: the drama of leaving the homeland, the impossibility of return, the unattainability of happiness, the anxiety of losing one's roots, the tragedy of transience. In some poems, impressionistic images of idyllic homeland predominate and some resemble expressionist miniatures with a strong charge of apart sensibility (lonely premonitions of death, unknown "something", pictorial and sound grotesque). Acting in the era of Croatian modernity, he accepted a variety of artistic and aesthetic programs. That is why his works are marked by stylistic searches in a thematic range from ancient mythology to the twilight atmospheres of European symbolism.

Works
Tamara
Četiri grada
Začarano ogledalo
Ispovijed

Posthumously:

References

Bibliography

Further reading

External links
http://frangalovic.net/
http://www.enciklopedija.hr/natuknica.aspx?id=21131

Croatian writers
1887 births
1914 deaths
Austro-Hungarian military personnel killed in World War I
Austro-Hungarian writers